Mohsine Moutaouali (born 3 March 1986 in Casablanca) is a Moroccan footballer who is currently playing as an attacking midfielder for Libyan Premier League side Al Ahli Tripoli. He can also play as a right winger.

Club career
In 2004, Moutaouali joined the youth team of Raja Club Athletic at the age of 18. In 2006, he was loaned to Union de Touarga in the second division to gain vital experience before coming back to Raja in 2007. He became one of Raja's best players from that point onwards, scoring vital goals and being noticed by clubs around the world. He joined Emirates Club of the United Arab Emirates in 2011, who were showing interest in him. However, he only stayed there for a year before coming back to Raja CA. Afterwards, he helped the Moroccan giants to win the 2012–13 Botola. The following season, he continued to shine, scoring 9 goals in 29 league matches. Because of his outstanding performances, he was called up to the national team for the 2014 African Nations Championship. After the end of the season, he signed a three-year contract with Qatari side Al-Wakrah in June 2014. He stayed in Qatar for five years before returning to Raja again in 2019.

International career

International goals
Scores and results list Morocco's goal tally first.

Honours

Club honours
Raja Club Athletic
 Botola (4): 2009, 2011, 2013, 2020
 Coupe du Trone (1): 2013
 CAF Confederation Cup (1): 2020-21
Arab Champions League (1): 2019-20
 Fifa Club World Cup: Runner-up 2013

Personal honours
 "Mars d'Or" Best Player of Botola: 2013
 Best Player of Botola: 2011, 2013, 2014
 Raja CA Player of the season: 2010, 2011, 2013, 2014
 Raja CA Player of the month: November 2019, January 2020, October 2021, February 2022

Personal life 

Mohcine Moutaouali married Yasmina Moutaouali, a Moroccan-French in 2010, and a year later had a daughter whom they named Dina. He has the names of his wife Yasmina, his daughter Dina, mother Habiba and his father the late Haj Slimane Moutaouali.

References

External links 

 Effectif du Raja de Casablanca

1986 births
Living people
Footballers from Casablanca
Moroccan footballers
Raja CA players
Emirates Club players
Al-Wakrah SC players
Al-Rayyan SC players
Al Ahli SC (Doha) players
Morocco international footballers
Moroccan expatriate footballers
Expatriate footballers in the United Arab Emirates
Expatriate footballers in Qatar
Morocco A' international footballers
2014 African Nations Championship players
Qatar Stars League players
UAE Pro League players
Association football midfielders
Moroccan expatriate sportspeople in Qatar
Moroccan expatriate sportspeople in the United Arab Emirates